Reckless Courage is a 1925 American silent Western film directed by Tom Gibson and starring Buddy Roosevelt, Helen Foster and Jay Morley.

Cast
 Buddy Roosevelt as Bud Keenan
 J.C. Fowler as Jasper Bayne
 Helen Foster as Doris Bayne
 William McIllwain as Butler
 Jay Morley as Jim Allen
 John M. O'Brien as Scar Degan 
 N.E. Hendrix as Shorty Baker
 Merrill McCormick as Chuck Carson 
 Eddie Barry as Slim Parker
 Neola May as Winona
 Bob Burns as The Law

References

Bibliography
 Connelly, Robert B. The Silents: Silent Feature Films, 1910-36, Volume 40, Issue 2. December Press, 1998.
 Munden, Kenneth White. The American Film Institute Catalog of Motion Pictures Produced in the United States, Part 1. University of California Press, 1997.

External links
 

1925 films
1925 Western (genre) films
American silent feature films
American Western (genre) films
American black-and-white films
Films directed by Tom Gibson
1920s English-language films
1920s American films